This is a list of urban localities in the Russian Far East, grouped by federal subject and sorted by population.  Administrative centers of federal subjects are listed in bold text. All population figures are estimates as of January 1, 2015.

Overall

References

Populated places in the Russian Far East
Russian Far East
Russian Far East